Gerardo Flores Zúñiga (born 5 February 1986) is a Mexican former professional footballer who played as a right-back.

Club career

Zacatepec

Gerardo Flores began his football career with cross town club Zacatepec FC in Morelos, Mexico. During his stay at Zacatepec, he would be called to the Mexican squad that would participate in the 2003 FIFA U-17 World Championship held in Finland by coach Julio Grondona.

Gerardo Flores played only one match with Zacatepec, in a quarter final game of the Clausura 2004 season versus Club Leon .

Monterrey
Flores came to CF Monterrey in 2005. he began playing with Monterrey's B team in the Primera A, but eventually rose to the first team. During the Clausura 2007 season Gerardo Flores made his professional debut for CF Monterrey under Coach Miguel Herrera, on February 17, 2007, in a 2–2 draw against Necaxa, Flores started and played the entire match. After one season with Monterrey Flores was Transferred to Atlas for the Apertura 2007 season.

Atlas
Being transferred to Atlas Flores got to play in the 2008 Copa Libertadores. He was loaned for two years to Jaguares. When he returned from Chiapas, he would play two more seasons with Atlas before signing with Cruz Azul in 2011 .

Jaguares
Flores was loaned to Jaguares, where he would stay on loan for 2 years. during his stay Flores and his teammates helped Jaguares reach the Quarter Final of the Clausura 2009 playoffs losing versus Pachuca.

Cruz Azul
He was transferred in June 2011 to Cruz Azul. During his time in Cruz Azul he won the Copa MX twice, as well as the CONCACAF Champions League once in 2013 and 2014 respectively. He also made 3 appearances in the 2014 FIFA Club World Cup losing to Real Madrid in the semifinals and losing for third place against New Zealand team Auckland City FC. He was also given the chance to play in the 2015 Copa America with Mexico but it was cut short as they failed to advance from the group stages. In the Apertura 2018 Liga MX Final vs Club America in the 87th minute he received a red card as a substitute when he grabbed a ball and pushed a player from Club America.

Toluca
On December 16, 2015, it was made official that Flores would be joining Deportivo Toluca in a season-long loan deal from Cruz Azul. On January 6, Flores made his debut with Toluca against Tigres de la UANL, he played 75' minutes and the team won with a single goal from Colombian striker Fernando Uribe at minute 90+.

On 23 February 2021, Flores announced his retirement from professional football. After not being in a club for nearly two years.

International

Mexico U-17
In 2003 Gerardo Flores was chosen by coach Julio Grondona to be part of the Mexican squad participating in the 2003 FIFA U-17 World Championship in Finland. Flores played every single game in the tournament. Flores scored once in the tournament against China. Mexico reached the quarterfinal losing 2–0 against Argentina.

Mexico
Mexico coach José Manuel de la Torre called up Gerardo Flores to participate in the 2014 FIFA World Cup Qualifiers and the 2013 FIFA Confederations Cup.

Flores received his first cap in a friendly against Peru in San Francisco, California.

2013 FIFA Confederations Cup
When Oribe Peralta was forced to withdraw from the Mexico squad because of injury, Mexico coach José Manuel de la Torre turned to Gerardo Flores to replace him.

He started in only the two first games of Mexico in the 2013 FIFA Confederations Cup.

Career statistics

International

Honours
Cruz Azul
Copa MX: Clausura 2013, Apertura 2018
CONCACAF Champions League: 2013–14

See also
List of people from Morelos, Mexico

References

External links
 
 
 
 Gerardo Flores  at Televisa Deportes
 
 

1986 births
Living people
Footballers from Morelos
Association football fullbacks
Mexico youth international footballers
Mexico international footballers
2013 FIFA Confederations Cup players
2015 Copa América players
C.F. Monterrey players
Atlas F.C. footballers
Chiapas F.C. footballers
Cruz Azul footballers
Deportivo Toluca F.C. players
Liga MX players
Mexican footballers